Lübbe is a German surname. Notable people with the surname include:

Ann Cathrin Lübbe (born 1971), Norwegian Paralympic equestrian
Heinrich Lübbe, German engineer
Marinus van der Lubbe, Dutch communist tried, convicted and executed for setting fire to the German Reichstag building in 1933
Melanie Lubbe (born 1990), German chess grandmaster
Vollrath Lübbe, highly decorated World War II Wehrmacht general